Jerry Lee Atwood may refer to:
 Jerry Lee Atwood (clothing designer), American clothing designer
 Jerry L. Atwood, American chemist